Turks in Russia, also referred to as Turkish Russians or Russian Turks, refers to people of full or partial ethnic Turkish origin who have either immigrated to Russia or who were born in the Russian state. The community is largely made up of several migration waves, including: descendants of Ottoman-Turkish captives during the Russo-Turkish wars; the Turkish Meskhetian community; and the more recent Turkish immigrants from the Republic of Turkey.

History

Ottoman migration

The First All-Union Census of the Soviet Union in 1926 recorded 8,570 Ottoman Turks living in the Soviet Union. The Ottoman Turks are no longer listed separately in the census, as it is presumed that those who were living in Russia in the 1920s have subsequently either been assimilated into Russian society or have left the country.

Meskhetian Turks migration
During World War II, the Soviet Union was preparing to launch a pressure campaign against Turkey. Vyacheslav Molotov, who was at the time the Minister of Foreign Affairs, made a request of the Turkish Ambassador in Moscow that Turkey surrender three Anatolian provinces (Kars, Ardahan and Artvin).[11] Thus, war against Turkey seemed possible, and Joseph Stalin wanted to commit a genocide to the strategic Turkish population situated in Meskheti, near the Turkish-Georgian border, since during the Russo-Turkish Wars the Turks of the region had been loyal to the Ottoman Empire and were therefore likely to be hostile to Soviet intentions.[11][12] In 1944, the Meskhetian Turks were forcefully deported from Meskheti, Georgia and accused of smuggling, banditry and espionage in collaboration with their kin across the Turkish border.[13]

Soviet authorities issued an official ruling that 17,000 Meskhetian Turks, virtually the entire Turkish population in the Ferghana Valley, be transported to Russia. Another 70,000 Meskhetian Turks from other parts of Uzbekistan soon followed the first wave of migrants and settled mainly in Azerbaijan and Russia.

In the late 1970s, the Stavropol and Krasnodar authorities visited various regions of Uzbekistan to invite and recruit Meskhetian Turks to work in agriculture enterprises in southern Russia. In 1985, Moscow issued a proposal inviting more Meskhetian Turks to move to villages in southern Russia that had been abandoned by ethnic Russians who were moving to the cities. However, the Meskhetian Turks response was that they would only leave Uzbekistan if the move were to be to their homeland. Then, in 1989, ethnic Uzbeks began a series of actions against the Turks; they became the victims of riots in the Ferghana valley which led to over a hundred deaths. Within days, Decision 503 was announced "inviting" the Turks to occupy the empty farms in southern Russia that they had resisted moving to for years and around 17,000 Meskhetian Turks were evacuated to Russia. Meskhetian Turks maintain that Moscow had planned the Uzbek riots. By the early 1990s, the 70,000 Meskhetian Turks who were still resident in Uzbekistan left for Azerbaijan, Russia and Ukraine due to fears of continued violence.

Mainland Turkish migration

During the 2000s, Russia witnessed increasing numbers of immigrants from Turkey; the number of Turkish labour migrants grew, on average, by 30–50% per annum. By 2008, over 130,000 Turkish citizens were working in Russia; most Turkish immigrants are those who married Russians in Turkey and then came to reside in the homeland of their spouse.

Demographics 

According to the 2010 Russian Census, 105,058 people declared themselves as "Turks" and 4,825 stated that they were "Meskhetian Turks"; hence, the census showed that there was a total of 109,883 Turks living in the country.

Discrimination
Meskhetian Turks in Russia, especially those in Krasnodar, have faced hostility from the local population. The Meskhetian Turks of Krasnodar have suffered significant human rights violations, including the deprivation of their citizenship. They have been deprived of civil, political and social rights and are prohibited from owning property and employment. Since 2004, many are now leaving the Krasnodar region for the United States as refugees.

Noble families 
Turchaninov family

Notable people 
This list includes people of full and partial Turkish origin.
 
 
 
 
 
Olga Semyonovna Zaplatina Aksakov, wife of Sergey Aksakov (Turkish mother)
children:
, Privy Councillor (Turkish grandmother)
Ivan Aksakov, littérateur and notable Slavophile (Turkish grandmother)
Konstantin Aksakov, critic and writer (Turkish grandmother)
Vera Aksakova, writer known for her diaries at the time of the Crimean War (Turkish grandmother)
Alina Boz, actress (Turkish Bulgarian father)
Ivan Bunin,
Elena Dmitrievna, Turkish captive during the Siege of Anapa; she converted to Christianity and married Mikhail Shchepkin
children and descendants:
, philologist 
, publisher, teacher and public figure 
 , historian, teacher and public figure
, linguist and art historian 
), politician
Petr Mikhailovich, lawyer, assistant chairman of the Moscow District Court 
Tatiana Shchepkina-Kupernik, writer, dramatist, poet and translator
Fyokla (Faina) Mikhailovna, actress
Alexandra Mikhailovna, actress 
, criminologist (paternal Turkish grandmother) 
Vasily Ekimov, sculptor (works include the Bronze Horseman, the Samson Fountain, and the Monument to Minin and Pozharsky)
Niyaz Ilyasov, judoka; medalists winner in the 2018 and 2019 World Judo Championships (Turkish Meskhetian origin)
, singer and theater actress 
Tina Kandelaki,  journalist, public figure, TV presenter and producer (half Turkish mother)
Vasily Kapnist, playwright and nobleman (Turkish mother) 
Alemdar Karamanov, composer (Turkish father) 
, Turkish child adopted by Russian soldiers during the Russo-Turkish War (1877–1878); she became a nurse during World War I
Eşref Kolçak, actor (Turkish father)
Elizaveta Vasilievna Krupskaya, mother-in-law of Vladimir Lenin (Turkish great-grandmother)
children:
Nadezhda Krupskaya, Russian revolutionary and the wife of Vladimir Lenin
, actress (Turkish father) 
Muslim Magomayev, opera and pop singer (Turkish maternal grandfather)
Maxim Can Mutaf, basketball player (Turkish father)
, Soviet war hero during the Great Patriotic War (Turkish Meskhetian origin)
Konstantin Paustovsky, writer nominated for the Nobel Prize for literature in 1965 (partial Turkish origin)
Pyotr Ivanovich Poletika, second Russian ambassador to the United States (Turkish mother)
Ekaterina Pavlovna Rosengeim, adopted daughter of Dmitry Golitsyn (Turkish mother) 
, educator (Turkish Meskhetian origin)
Alexey Verstovsky, composer and musical bureaucrat (Turkish grandmother)
Vasily Andreevich Zhukovsky, poet and a leading figure in Russian literature (Turkish mother)
children and descendants:
Alexandra Zhukovskaya, Countess of the Russian Empire (Turkish grandmother)
Aleksey Belevsky-Zhukovsky, Count of the Russian Empire (Turkish great-grandmother)

See also 
Russia–Turkey relations
Turks in the former Soviet Union 
Turks in Armenia
Turks in Azerbaijan
Turks in Ukraine
Turks in Kazakhstan
Turks in Europe
Turks in Finland
Turks in Germany
Turks in Poland
Turks in Sweden

References

Notes

Bibliography 
 
.

.

.

.
 .
 
 .

Russia
Russia
Ethnic groups in Russia
Muslim communities of Russia